Marius Job Cohen (born 18 October 1947) is a retired Dutch politician and jurist who served as Mayor of Amsterdam from 2001 to 2010 and Leader of the Labour Party (PvdA) from 2010 to 2012.

Cohen studied Law at the University of Groningen obtaining a Master of Laws degree. Cohen worked as researcher at the Leiden University before finishing his thesis and graduated as a Doctor of Law in Jurisprudence. Cohen worked as a professor of jurisprudence at the State University of Limburg from September 1983 until June 1993, he also served as Rector Magnificus of the State University of Limburg from January 1991. Cohen was appointed as State Secretary for Education and Sciences in the Cabinet Lubbers III following a cabinet reshuffle taking office on 9 June 1993. In February 1994 Cohen announced that he wouldn't stand for the election of 1994. Cohen continued to be active in politics and after the Senate election of 1995 was elected as a Member of the Senate on 13 June 1995 and served as a frontbencher and spokesperson for Justice, Education and Science. Cohen also returned to State University of Limburg and again worked as professor of Jurisprudence and served as Rector Magnificus from January 1995 until August 1998. Following the resignation of Parliamentary leader Joop van den Berg Cohen was selected as his successor on 1 August 1996.

After the election of 1998 Cohen was appointed as State Secretary for Justice in the Cabinet Kok II taking office on 3 August 1998. In December 2000 Cohen was nominated as the next Mayor of Amsterdam serving from 15 January 2001 until his resignation on 12 March 2010. Shortly before an upcoming election Labour Leader Wouter Bos unexpectedly announced his retirement and Cohen announced his candidacy and was anonymously selected as his successor on 25 April 2010. For the election of 2010 Cohen served as Lijsttrekker (top candidate) and was elected as a Member of the House of Representatives and became Parliamentary leader on 17 June 2010. In January 2012 Cohen announced his retirement and that he was stepping down as Leader and Parliamentary leader on 20 February 2012 but continued to serve in the House of Representatives as a backbencher until his resignation on 29 February 2012.

Cohen retired from active politics at 64 and became active in the public sector as a non-profit director and served on several state commissions and councils on behalf of the government, and worked as a distinguished professor of Constitutional law and Governmental studies at his alma mater in Leiden from April 2014 until January 2019.

Biography

Family and education
Marius Job Cohen was born in Haarlem. He is the second child (of two) of Adolf Emile "Dolf" Cohen (1913–2004) and Henriëtte "Hetty" Koster (1913–1996). His elder brother is Floris Cohen (born 1946).

His parents both studied history and became high school teachers of history. They were liberal (non-religious) Jews, and were forced into hiding until the end of World War II. His paternal grandparents Hendrik Cohen and Flora Polak both were murdered in Bergen-Belsen concentration camp in 1945. After the war, his father worked at the Dutch Institute for War Documentation. Later he became a professor of medieval history and a rector magnificus at Leiden University. His mother became a member of the city council of Heemstede. His parents were both early members of the Labour Party.

Cohen attended public primary school in Heemstede. He attended the secondary school Stedelijk Gymnasium in Haarlem from 1960 to 1966. He studied Dutch public law at the University of Groningen from 1966 and obtained his Master of Laws degree in 1971. During his student years, he was a member of the student association Vindicat atque Polit.

Cohen married Lidie Lodeweges on 2 July 1972 in Groningen. She studied Dutch language in Groningen and was a high school teacher. She had multiple sclerosis and needed a wheelchair. Cohen and his wife had two children, son Jaap (born 1980) and daughter Lotje (born 1983). Lidie Cohen died on 4 August 2015.

Academic career
Between 1 September 1971 and 1 September 1981, Job Cohen held a scientific position at the Bureau Research of Education at Leiden University. He obtained a doctorate (PhD) from this university in June 1981, with a dissertation on the rights of university students.

On 1 September 1981 he joined the State University of Limburg in a higher scientific capacity, and was chairman of the commission that prepared the establishment of a faculty of law. On 1 September 1983 Cohen became professor of methods and techniques at the faculty of law; on 1 January 1991 he also became rector magnificus of the State University of Limburg. He resigned from this position to become State Secretary for Education and Sciences in 1993.

In 1995 he returned to his position in Maastricht as professor and rector magnificus at Maastricht University (the former State University of Limburg). From 1 January 1998, he took a sabbatical year, but he resigned in August 1998 when he became State Secretary for Justice.

Cohen has received two honorary degrees for his contributions to law and society, one in 2007 from the University of Windsor and one in 2008 from the Radboud University Nijmegen.

Political career

State Secretary for Education and Sciences 
On 2 July 1993, Cohen became State Secretary (deputy minister) for Education and Sciences in the third cabinet of Ruud Lubbers, under education minister Jo Ritzen. In Cohen's portfolio were higher and academic education, science policy, and adult education. The term of this post expired after a year and Cohen returned to his academic post in Maastricht.

Member of the Senate 
From 13 June 1995, Cohen was a member of the Senate of the Netherlands. Between 1 August 1996 until he resigned from the Senate on 3 August 1998, he was also the parliamentary group leader of the Labour Party in the Senate.

During his period in the Senate, he also worked for the Maastricht University, where he began a sabbatical year on 1 January 1998. In February 1998 however, he took on the function of interim-director of the broadcasting organization VPRO, lasting until 15 August.

State Secretary for Justice 
On 3 August 1998, he resigned from the Senate to take up the position of State Secretary for Justice in the second cabinet of Wim Kok, dealing chiefly with immigration. In this capacity he was responsible for a new immigration law, intended to restrict entry of refugees to "genuine cases".

Mayor of Amsterdam 
He resigned his position as State Secretary on 31 December 2000 in order to take up the position of Mayor of Amsterdam (burgemeester) on 15 January 2001. Mayors of Dutch cities are appointed by the cabinet in the name of the monarch.

At midnight on 1 April 2001, Cohen became the first public official to wed same-sex couples, following the passing of legislation opening up marriage to people of the same gender (see same-sex marriage in the Netherlands).

On 2 February 2002, Job Cohen performed the civil marriage of Prince Willem-Alexander and Máxima Zorreguieta in the Beurs van Berlage in Amsterdam.

In November 2004, controversial film maker Theo van Gogh was killed in Amsterdam by a Muslim extremist. Time awarded Cohen the title "European Hero" in 2005, for his inclusive approach towards the Muslim community after the murder, defusing tension in the city.

Cohen found himself thrown into the role of mediator between the city's Muslims, the original Dutch population and other groups in the cultural and racial mix. Almost half Amsterdam's residents are of non-Western descent, a majority of them Muslims."Islam is here to stay, in this country, in this city (...) We have to deal with Islam as a fact, not whether we like it. So the real question is how to get on with each other." Cohen took pride in the fact that in Amsterdam no violence or arson occurred in response to the killing. By his visiting ethnic groups, organizing debates among religious leaders and his listening and promoting dialogue, he received from opponents the mocking nickname of "tea drinker" – an image that would be exploited by them when he returned in the Dutch national politics in 2010.

On 27 January 2006 Cohen announced he would be willing to serve a second term as mayor of Amsterdam. On 12 July 2006 the municipality of Amsterdam almost unanimously (Democrats 66 opposed, being in favour of an elected mayor) supported Cohen to prolong his career as a mayor after 15 January 2007 when his first term ended.

Cohen's politics towards ethnic minorities in Amsterdam was characterized by the slogan "keeping things together" (de boel bij elkaar houden). On 2 May 2006 Immigration Minister Rita Verdonk of the centre-right VVD accused Amsterdam of becoming a "banana republic" with a lax safety policy; she cited the criminal liquidations and the disturbance caused by young people as examples of this. However, in the yearly crime meter of the Algemeen Dagblad Amsterdam did not perform particularly badly in safety policy and crime fighting. One of the reasons for this was Cohen's targeted approach towards those who commit multiple crimes (veelplegers). Cohen stated that his policy which combines soft and hard approaches, fighting crime and fighting the causes of crime, was the key to his successful safety policy.

In 2006 Cohen was the runner-up in the award for World Mayor of 2006, behind Melbourne mayor John So, and ahead of Harrisburg mayor Stephen R. Reed. World Mayor praised Cohen's leadership following the murder of Theo van Gogh in 2004, and his efforts at bringing together the diverse population of Amsterdam.

In late 2007, Cohen moved to reduce prostitution in Amsterdam, following allegations that Hells Angels and other organized criminals had taken over the prostitution industry. The city council bought 18 buildings in the red light district De Wallen from Charlie Geerts in order to convert them into upscale establishments and revoked the license of the luxury brothel Yab Yum.

Leader of the Labour Party

On 12 March 2010, Wouter Bos resigned as leader of the Labour Party. Bos named Cohen as candidate for the position, which he accepted. At the subsequent elections, Cohen was a candidate for Prime Minister. He was expected to be a strong opponent to Geert Wilders and was described in the press as "authoritarian but enlightened." Exit polls showed the Labour Party as the second largest with 30 seats and 19.6% of the total vote. Eventually his opponent Mark Rutte of the VVD became the Prime Minister of the Netherlands.

He has been chair of the Labour Party in the House of Representatives since 10 June 2010 and a member of the House of Representatives since 17 June 2010.

On 20 February 2012, he resigned as leader of the Labour Party, he also left the House of Representatives over criticisms that he had been too moderate towards the center-right Dutch government's planned economic austerity measures and the Dutch government's support for the EU Commission's plan to bail out Greece, which had been passed with the support of the Dutch Labour Party. At the time of his resignation, the Dutch Socialist Party, politically to the left of the Dutch Labour Party, had overtaken the Dutch Labour Party in a number of opinion polls.

Honors and awards
 European Hero (2005), Time Magazine
 Best Mayor of the Last 25 Years (2005), Binnenlands Bestuur
 Citizenship Award (2005), P&V Foundation
 Honorary degree (2007), University of Windsor, Ontario, Canada
 Advertising Man of the Year (2007), Marketing Tribune
 Honorary degree (2008), Radboud University Nijmegen
 Martin Luther King Award (2008), DutchVersity
 Gold Medal (2010), city council of Amsterdam

Works 
Books (as author)
 Studierechten in het wetenschappelijk onderwijs (1981), dissertation
 Wandeling door een historisch besluit (2003)
 Binden (2009), collection of speeches and lectures

Audio books (as narrator)
 Het grijze kind (2007), novel written by Theo Thijssen
 De Uitvreter (2008), novella written by Nescio
 Lijmen/Het Been (2009), two novellas written by Willem Elsschot
 Kaas (2009), novella written by Willem Elsschot
 Titaantjes (2010), novella written by Nescio
 Max Havelaar (2010), novel written by Multatuli
 Reizen zonder John (2012), non-fiction written by Geert Mak
 Het dwaallicht (2013), novella written by Willem Elsschot
 De eeuw van mijn vader (2013), non-fiction written by Geert Mak
 De levens van Jan Six (2016), non-fiction written by Geert Mak

Decorations

References

External links

Official
  Prof.Mr.Dr. M.J. (Job) Cohen Parlement & Politiek
  Prof.Mr.Dr. M.J. Cohen (PvdA) Eerste Kamer der Staten-Generaal

 
 

 
 

 

 
 

 

 
 

 

 
 

 

 

 

 

1947 births
Living people
Copyright activists
Dutch academic administrators
Dutch Jews
Dutch legal scholars
Dutch legal writers
Dutch lobbyists
Dutch memoirists
Dutch nonprofit directors
Dutch nonprofit executives
Dutch public broadcasting administrators
Dutch scholars of constitutional law
Dutch trade association executives
Euthanasia activists
Grand Officiers of the Légion d'honneur
Governmental studies academics
Jewish Dutch politicians
Jewish Dutch writers
Jewish educators
Jewish mayors of places in the Netherlands
Jurisprudence academics
Knights of the Order of Orange-Nassau
Knights of the Order of the Netherlands Lion
Labour Party (Netherlands) politicians
Leiden University alumni
Academic staff of Leiden University
Academic staff of Maastricht University
Mayors of Amsterdam
Members of the House of Representatives (Netherlands)
Members of the Senate (Netherlands)
Rectors of universities in the Netherlands
Leaders of the Labour Party (Netherlands)
Politicians from Haarlem
Recipients of the Cross of Recognition
State Secretaries for Education of the Netherlands
State Secretaries for Justice of the Netherlands
University of Groningen alumni
Writers from Amsterdam
20th-century Dutch educators
20th-century Dutch jurists
20th-century Dutch male writers
20th-century Dutch politicians
21st-century Dutch educators
21st-century Dutch jurists
21st-century Dutch male writers
21st-century Dutch politicians